Sneham may refer to:

Sneham (1977 film) Indian Malayalam language directed by A Bheem Singh
Sneham (1998 film)  Indian Malayalam language directed by Jayaraj